Elien Van Wynendaele (born 19 February 1995) is a former Belgian soccer midfielder who last played for Eendracht Aalst in Belgium's First Division.

Club career
Van Wynendaele started her career at the age of 4, with the youth team of the East Flemish Bambrugge. She then moved to Club Brugge KV via RSC Anderlecht, in 2011. In 2013, she joined AA Gent.

Having struggled with knee injuries since the Euro 2017 tournament, Van Wynendaele decided to step down from top-tier football and signed for D1 team E. Aalst Ladies in 2019. She captained her last game for Gent during the final match of Play-Off 1 against KRC Genk Ladies.

In early 2020, after only a few months at Aalst, Van Wynendaele was again injured and ended her career definitely, at age 24.

International career
On 7 June 2010, Van Wynendaele started her international career playing for Belgium U15 in a friendly match against the Netherlands. Between 2010 and 2012, she played 17 games for the Belgium U17 team and scored one goal. Her first game for the U17 side was on 28 August against Wales. On 19 September 2012, Van Wynendaele debuted for Belgium U19 team against Finland in Tammela, Finland. On 21 June 2014 she played her last match for the U19 side against the Netherlands in Mjøndalen. On 26 November 2014, Van Wynendaele played her first and only match for Belgium U21 team against Turkey in Tubize.

Van Wynendaele was part of the group who represented Belgium at the 2017 Cyprus Women's Cup and at the UEFA Women's Euro 2017.

After football
Van Wynendaele works as a physiotherapist at the Medical Sports Centre in the municipality of Lebbeke.

Career statistics

International 

Scores and results list Belgium's goal tally first, score column indicates score after each Belgium goal.

References

External links
 Player's Profile at UEFA
 
 

1995 births
Living people
Belgian women's footballers
Belgium women's international footballers
Women's association football midfielders
RSC Anderlecht (women) players
Super League Vrouwenvoetbal players
BeNe League players
Club Brugge KV (women) players
K.A.A. Gent (women) players
Belgium women's youth international footballers
UEFA Women's Euro 2017 players